Shardaben Anilbhai Patel (born 21 March 1948) is an Indian politician and a member of the 17th Lok Sabha, the lower house of the parliament.

Biography 
Shardaben Patel completed her schooling from N. M. Nutan Sarva Vidhyalaya, Visnagar in 1964. She completed the first year of B. A. from M. N. College in Visnagar in 1965–66 and dropped out.

She is vice-president of Stree Kelavani Uttejak Mandal, Ahmedabad. She is a trustee of the Sankalchand Patel University, Visnagar. She presides over the governing council of the MG Patel Sainik School for Girls in Ganpat Vidhyanagar.

She contested the 2019 Indian general election and was elected to the 17th Lok Sabha from the Mehsana constituency.

Personal life
Shardaben Patel married Anilkumar Patel (1944–2018), an industrialist and politician who had served as the minister of industries of Gujarat. They have two sons: Asit and Anand.

References

External links
Official biographical sketch in Parliament of India website

Bharatiya Janata Party politicians from Gujarat
People from Mehsana district
India MPs 2019–present
Living people
Women in Gujarat politics
Lok Sabha members from Gujarat
21st-century Indian women politicians
21st-century Indian politicians
1948 births